Thomas David Schall (June 4, 1878December 22, 1935) was an American lawyer and politician. He served in both the United States House of Representatives and the United States Senate from Minnesota. He was initially elected and then re-elected as a Progressive but later joined the Republican Party.

Schall was born in Reed City, Michigan, and moved with his family to Campbell, Minnesota, in 1884. He initially attended Hamline University, but graduated from the University of Minnesota in 1902, followed by William Mitchell College of Law (then the St. Paul College of Law) in 1904. Three years later, he was blinded by an electrical shock from a cigar lighter.

Schall was elected to the House of Representatives in 1914 and served from March 4, 1915, to March 3, 1925, in the 64th, 65th, 66th, 67th, and 68th congresses. As he was legally blind, he was granted, by House vote, a full-time page to assist him with his work.

After losing the Republican primary for a special election to the Senate in 1923, Schall was elected to the Senate in 1924, defeating Magnus Johnson with 46% of the vote. He served from March 4, 1925, until his death, in the 69th, 70th, 71st, 72nd, and 73rd congresses. Johnson would challenge Schall's election, leading the blind Senator to infamously label him “a marionette who kicked and waved his hands and opened his mouth according to the tension of the string." He had a tough re-election campaign in 1930, facing strong candidates from both the Democratic and Farmer Labor parties, and eventually won with 37% of the vote with the support of the NAACP owing to support of the Dyer Anti-Lynching Bill.

Long noted as a vitriolic and personal campaigner, Schall would emerge as a leading opponent of the New Deal, going so far as to compare Franklin D. Roosevelt to Satan and claim his reform program was communistic in nature. Going further, Schall would accuse Eleanor Roosevelt of corruption and liken President Roosevelt to Mussolini and Hitler, while at the same time accusing him of plotting "the destruction of all private industry."

Schall was struck by a hit and run driver while walking across the Washington-Baltimore Boulevard, now known as Bladensburg Road, in Cottage City, Maryland, on December 19, 1935. He died in Washington three days later, becoming one of the few United States Senators or Congressmen to die in a road accident while in office. He is buried in Lakewood Cemetery in Minneapolis.

See also
 List of United States Congress members who died in office (1900–49)

References

George Daniel Harden, The Career of Thomas Schall of Minnesota, unpublished M.S. thesis, Winona State University, Winona, Minn., 1968.

External links
 

1878 births
1935 deaths
University of Minnesota alumni
William Mitchell College of Law alumni
Minnesota lawyers
American Episcopalians
People from Reed City, Michigan
Pedestrian road incident deaths
Road incident deaths in Maryland
American blind people
Blind politicians
Republican Party United States senators from Minnesota
Minnesota Progressives (1912)
American politicians with disabilities
Progressive Party (1912) members of the United States House of Representatives
Republican Party members of the United States House of Representatives from Minnesota
People from Wilkin County, Minnesota